Yugoslavia competed at the 1959 Mediterranean Games held in Beirut, Lebanon.

Medalists

Medals by sport

References

External links
Yugoslavia at the 1959 Mediterranean Games at the Olympic Museum Belgrade website
1959 Official Report at the International Mediterranean Games Committee

Nations at the 1959 Mediterranean Games
1959
1959 in Yugoslav sport